Beit Awkar,  Beit Okar, Beit Aoukar   is a village in Zgharta District, in the Northern Governorate of Lebanon. It is located 15 km to the east of Tripoli, 10 km from Zgharta. 

The people of the village are predominantly  Maronite Christians.

It has a beautiful nature and a strategic view over Tripoli, Zgharta, Koura, and part of Dunnieh and Bsharreh mountains. It is well known for having a high level of educated people and priests. Amongst notable people from the village is Mary Rose Oakar, a 27-year-old congresswoman and a fighter for Arabic rights in the United States.
We note that most of the villagers have the same family name, Awkar.

References

External links
Ehden Family Tree 

Populated places in the North Governorate
Zgharta District
Maronite Christian communities in Lebanon